Maiestas truncatus (formerly Recilia truncatus) is a species of insect from Cicadellidae family that is endemic to India. It was formerly placed within Recilia, but a 2009 revision moved it to Maiestas.

References

Endemic fauna of India
Hemiptera of Asia
Insects described in 1998
Maiestas